Agrococcus is a genus in the phylum Actinomycetota (Bacteria).

Etymology
The name Agrococcus derives from:Greek noun agros, field or soil; New Latin masculine gender noun coccus (from Greek masculine gender noun , grain, seed), coccus; New Latin masculine gender noun Agrococcus a coccus from soil.

A group at the University of British Columbia completed the first draft genome of a bacterium from the genus Agrococcus, which was isolated from modern microbialites found within Pavilion Lake, BC.

Species
The genus contains 9 species, namely
 A. baldri ( Zlamala et al. 2002, ; New Latin genitive case noun baldri, of Baldr, ancient German god of light, referring to the photochromogenic behavior.)
 A. carbonis (Dhanjal et al. 2010, ; Latin genitive case noun carbonis  of charcoal or coal; referring to the fact it was isolated from the soil of a coal mine.
 A. casei ( Bora et al. 2007, ;: Latin genitive case noun casei, of cheese, named because the organism was isolated from smear-ripened cheeses.)
 A. citreus ( Wieser et al. 1999, ; Latin masculine gender adjective citreus, of or pertaining to the citron-tree; intended to mean lemon-yellow, describing the lemon-yellow pigmentation.)
 A. jejuensis ( Lee 2008, ; New Latin masculine gender adjective jejuensis, of or belonging to Jeju, Republic of Korea, where the type strain was isolated.)
 A. jenensis ( Groth et al. 1996,  (Type species of the genus).; New Latin masculine gender adjective jenensis, of or belonging to the Thuringian town Jena, where the organism was isolated.)
 A. lahaulensis ( Mayilraj et al. 2006, ; New Latin masculine gender adjective lahaulensis, of or pertaining to Lahaul Valley, located in the Indian Himalayas, where the type strain was isolated.)
 A. pavilionensis (White III et al. 2018, ; New Latin masculine gender adjective pavilionensis, of or pertaining to Pavilion Lake, located in Southeastern British Columbia, where the type strain was isolated.) 
 A. terreus ( Zhang et al. 2010, ; Latin masculine gender adjective terreus, of earth.)
 A. versicolor ( Behrendt et al. 2008, ; Latin masculine gender adjective versicolor, colour changing.)

See also
 Bacterial taxonomy
 Microbiology

References 

Bacteria genera
Microbacteriaceae